Inga Arfwidsson (born 26 April 1940) is a Swedish female curler.

She was a board member of the Swedish Curling Association (SCA) from 1980 to 1988, and was SCA chairperson from 1990 to 1991.

She is also an international curling judge.

In 1979 she was inducted into the Swedish Curling Hall of Fame.

Personal life
Her older sister Barbro was her teammate.

Teams

References

External links
 

Svensk Curling nr 1 2013 by Svenska Curlingförbundet - issuu (page 12-13, "Inga Arfwidsson")

Living people
1940 births
Swedish female curlers
European curling champions
Swedish curling champions
20th-century Swedish women